Scoil Chonglais is a post-primary school situated in Baltinglass, County Wicklow.  It is owned and run by County Wicklow Vocational Education Committee (VEC).

References

External links
School website

Secondary schools in County Wicklow